The state of Telangana, India, has 497 bird species within its boundaries.

The official state bird of Telangana is the pala pitta, also known as the Indian roller, Coracias benghalensis.

This list's taxonomic treatment (designation and sequence of orders, families and species) and nomenclature (common and scientific names) follow the conventions of the IOC World Bird List, version 11.2. This list also uses British English throughout. Any bird names or other wording follows that convention.

The following tags have been used to highlight several categories. The commonly occurring native species do not fit within any of these categories.

(A) Accidental - Also known as a rarity, it refers to a species that rarely or accidentally occurs in Telangana-typically less than ten confirmed records.

Ducks, geese, and swans

Order: AnseriformesFamily: Anatidae

Anatidae includes the ducks and most duck-like waterfowl, such as geese and swans. These birds are adapted to an aquatic existence with webbed feet, flattened bills, and feathers that are excellent at shedding water due to an oily coating.

Lesser whistling duck, Dendrocygna javanica
Fulvous whistling duck, Dendrocygna bicolor
Bar-headed goose, Anser indicus
Greylag goose, Anser anser
Knob-billed duck, Sarkidiornis melanotos
Ruddy shelduck, Tadorna ferruginea
Cotton pygmy goose, Nettapus coromandelianus
Garganey, Spatula querquedula
Northern shoveler, Spatula clypeata
Gadwall, Mareca strepera
Eurasian wigeon, Mareca penelope
Indian spot-billed duck, Anas poecilorhyncha
Mallard, Anas platyrhynchos
Northern pintail, Anas acuta
Eurasian teal, Anas crecca
Red-crested pochard, Netta rufina
Common pochard, Aythya ferina
Ferruginous duck, Aythya nyroca
Tufted duck, Aythya fuligula

Pheasants and allies

Order: GalliformesFamily: Phasianidae

The Phasianidae are a family of terrestrial birds which consists of quails, partridges, snowcocks, francolins, spurfowls, tragopans, monals, pheasants, peafowls and jungle fowls. In general, they are plump (although they vary in size) and have broad, relatively short wings.

Painted francolin, Francolinus pictus
Grey francolin, Francolinus pondicerianus
Common quail, Coturnix coturnix
Rain quail, Coturnix coromandelica
King quail, Excalfactoria chinensis
Jungle bush quail, Perdicula asiatica
Rock bush quail, Perdicula argoondah
Painted bush quail, Perdicula erythrorhyncha
Red spurfowl, Galloperdix spadicea
Painted spurfowl, Galloperdix lunulata
Red junglefowl, Gallus gallus
Grey junglefowl, Gallus sonneratii
Indian peafowl, Pavo cristatus

Nightjars

Order: CaprimulgiformesFamily: Caprimulgidae

Nightjars are medium-sized nocturnal birds that usually nest on the ground. They have long wings, short legs and very short bills. Most have small feet, of little use for walking, and long pointed wings. Their soft plumage is camouflaged to resemble bark or leaves.

Jungle nightjar, Caprimulgus indicus
Grey nightjar, Caprimulgus jotaka
Jerdon's nightjar, Caprimulgus atripennis
Large-tailed nightjar, Caprimulgus macrurus
Indian nightjar, Caprimulgus asiaticus
Savanna nightjar, Caprimulgus affinis

Treeswifts

Order: ApodiformesFamily: Hemiprocnidae

The treeswifts, also called crested swifts, are closely related to the true swifts. They differ from the other swifts in that they have crests, long forked tails and softer plumage.

Crested treeswift, Hemiprocne coronata

Swifts
Order: ApodiformesFamily: Apodidae

Swifts are small birds which spend the majority of their lives flying. These birds have very short legs and never settle voluntarily on the ground, perching instead only on vertical surfaces. Many swifts have long swept-back wings which resemble a crescent or boomerang.

White-rumped spinetail, Zoonavena sylvatica 
Asian palm swift, Cypsiurus balasiensis
Alpine swift, Tachymarptis melba
Blyth's swift, Apus leuconyx
Little swift, Apus affinis
House swift, Apus nipalensis

Bustards

Order: OtidiformesFamily: Otididae

Bustards are large terrestrial birds mainly associated with dry open country and steppes in the Old World. They are omnivorous and nest on the ground. They walk steadily on strong legs and big toes, pecking for food as they go. They have long broad wings with "fingered" wingtips and striking patterns in flight. Many have interesting mating displays.

Great Indian bustard, Ardeotis nigriceps
Lesser florican, Sypheotides indicus

Cuckoos

Order: CuculiformesFamily: Cuculidae

The family Cuculidae includes cuckoos, roadrunners and anis. These birds are of variable size with slender bodies, long tails and strong legs. Many are brood parasites.

Greater coucal, Centropus sinensis
Sirkeer malkoha, Taccocua leschenaultii
Blue-faced malkoha, Phaenicophaeus viridirostris
Chestnut-winged cuckoo, Clamator coromandus
Jacobin cuckoo, Clamator jacobinus
Asian koel, Eudynamys scolopaceus
Banded bay cuckoo, Cacomantis sonneratii
Plaintive cuckoo, Cacomantis merulinus
Grey-bellied cuckoo, Cacomantis passerinus
Fork-tailed drongo-cuckoo, Surniculus dicruroides
Large hawk-cuckoo, Hierococcyx sparverioides
Common hawk-cuckoo, Hierococcyx varius
Lesser cuckoo, Cuculus poliocephalus
Indian cuckoo, Cuculus micropterus
Common cuckoo, Cuculus canorus

Sandgrouse
Order: PterocliformesFamily: Pteroclidae

Sandgrouse have small, pigeon like heads and necks, but sturdy compact bodies. They have long pointed wings and sometimes tails and a fast direct flight. Flocks fly to watering holes at dawn and dusk. Their legs are feathered down to the toes.

Chestnut-bellied sandgrouse, Pterocles exustus
Painted sandgrouse, Pterocles indicus

Pigeons and doves

Order: ColumbiformesFamily: Columbidae

Pigeons and doves are stout-bodied birds with short necks and short slender bills with a fleshy cere.

Rock pigeon, Columba livia
Pale-capped pigeon, Columba punicea
Oriental turtle dove, Streptopelia orientalis
Eurasian collared dove, Streptopelia decaocto
Red collared dove, Streptopelia tranquebarica
Spotted dove, Spilopelia chinensis
Laughing dove, Spilopelia senegalensis
Common emerald dove, Chalcophaps indica
Orange-breasted green pigeon, Treron bicinctus
Thick-billed green pigeon, Treron curvirostra
Yellow-footed green pigeon, Treron phoenicopterus
Green imperial pigeon, Ducula aenea

Rails, crakes, and coots

Order: GruiformesFamily: Rallidae

Rallidae is a large family of small to medium-sized birds which includes the rails, crakes, coots and gallinules. Typically they inhabit dense vegetation in damp environments near lakes, swamps or rivers. In general they are shy and secretive birds, making them difficult to observe. Most species have strong legs and long toes which are well adapted to soft uneven surfaces. They tend to have short, rounded wings and to be weak fliers.

Water rail, Rallus aquaticus
Slaty-breasted rail, Lewinia striata
Common moorhen, Gallinula chloropus
Eurasian coot, Fulica atra
Grey-headed swamphen, Porphyrio poliocephalus
Ruddy-breasted crake, Zapornia fusca
Brown crake, Zapornia akool
Baillon's crake, Zapornia pusilla
Slaty-legged crake, Rallina eurizonoides
Watercock, Gallicrex cinerea
White-breasted waterhen, Amaurornis phoenicurus

Cranes

Order: GruiformesFamily: Gruidae

Cranes are large, long-legged and long-necked birds. Unlike the similar-looking but unrelated herons, cranes fly with necks outstretched, not pulled back. Most have elaborate and noisy courting displays or "dances".

Demoiselle crane, Grus virgo (A)
Common crane, Grus grus

Grebes

Order: PodicipediformesFamily: Podicipedidae

Grebes are small to medium-large freshwater diving birds. They have lobed toes and are excellent swimmers and divers. However, they have their feet placed far back on the body, making them quite ungainly on land.

Little grebe, Tachybaptus ruficollis

Flamingos

Order: PhoenicopteriformesFamily: Phoenicopteridae

Flamingos filter-feed on shellfish and algae. Their oddly shaped beaks are specially adapted to separate mud and silt from the food they consume and, uniquely, are used upside-down.

Greater flamingo, Phoenicopterus roseus
Lesser flamingo, Phoenicopterus minor

Buttonquail
Order: CharadriiformesFamily: Turnicidae

The buttonquail are small, drab, running birds which resemble the true quails. The female is the brighter of the sexes and initiates courtship. The male incubates the eggs and tends the young.

Common buttonquail, Turnix sylvaticus
Yellow-legged buttonquail, Turnix tanki
Barred buttonquail, Turnix suscitator

Stone-curlews and thick-knees

Order: CharadriiformesFamily: Burhinidae

The stone-curlews are a group of largely tropical waders in the family Burhinidae. They are found worldwide within the tropical zone, with some species also breeding in temperate Europe and Australia. They are medium to large waders with strong black or yellow-black bills, large yellow eyes and cryptic plumage. Despite being classed as waders, most species have a preference for arid or semi-arid habitats.

Indian stone-curlew, Burhinus indicus
Great stone-curlew, Esacus recurvirostris

Stilts and avocets

Order: CharadriiformesFamily: Recurvirostridae

Recurvirostridae is a family of large wading birds, which includes the avocets and stilts. The avocets have long legs and long up-curved bills. The stilts have extremely long legs and long, thin, straight bills.

Black-winged stilt, Himantopus himantopus
Pied avocet, Recurvirostra avosetta

Plovers

Order: CharadriiformesFamily: Charadriidae

The family Charadriidae includes the plovers, dotterels and lapwings. They are small to medium-sized birds with compact bodies, short, thick necks and long, usually pointed, wings. They are found in open country worldwide, mostly in habitats near water.

River lapwing, Vanellus duvaucelii
Yellow-wattled lapwing, Vanellus malabaricus
Grey-headed lapwing, Vanellus cinereus
Red-wattled lapwing, Vanellus indicus
Sociable lapwing, Vanellus gregarius
White-tailed lapwing, Vanellus leucurus
Pacific golden plover, Pluvialis fulva
Grey plover, Pluvialis squatarola
Common ringed plover, Charadrius hiaticula 
Little ringed plover, Charadrius dubius
Kentish plover, Charadrius alexandrinus
Lesser sand plover, Charadrius mongolus
Greater sand plover, Charadrius leschenaultii

Painted-snipes
Order: CharadriiformesFamily: Rostratulidae

Painted-snipes are short-legged, long-billed birds similar in shape to the true snipes, but more brightly coloured.

Greater painted-snipe, Rostratula benghalensis

Jacanas
Order: CharadriiformesFamily: Jacanidae

The jacanas are a group of tropical waders in the family Jacanidae. They are found throughout the tropics. They are identifiable by their huge feet and claws which enable them to walk on floating vegetation in the shallow lakes that are their preferred habitat.

Pheasant-tailed jacana, Hydrophasianus chirurgus
Bronze-winged jacana, Metopidius indicus

Sandpipers and snipes

Order: CharadriiformesFamily: Scolopacidae

Scolopacidae is a large diverse family of small to medium-sized shorebirds including the sandpipers, curlews, godwits, shanks, tattlers, woodcocks, snipes, dowitchers and phalaropes. The majority of these species eat small invertebrates picked out of the mud or soil. Variation in length of legs and bills enables multiple species to feed in the same habitat, particularly on the coast, without direct competition for food.

Eurasian whimbrel, Numenius phaeopus
Eurasian curlew, Numenius arquata
Bar-tailed godwit, Limosa lapponica
Black-tailed godwit, Limosa limosa
Ruddy turnstone, Arenaria interpres
Ruff, Calidris pugnax
Curlew sandpiper, Calidris ferruginea
Temminck's stint, Calidris temminckii
Red-necked stint, Calidris ruficollis
Sanderling, Calidris alba
Dunlin, Calidris alpina
Little stint, Calidris minuta
Jack snipe, Lymnocryptes minimus'
Pin-tailed snipe, Gallinago stenuraCommon snipe, Gallinago gallinagoTerek sandpiper, Xenus cinereusRed-necked phalarope, Phalaropus lobatusRed phalarope, Phalaropus fulicarius (A)
Common sandpiper, Actitis hypoleucosGreen sandpiper, Tringa ochropusCommon redshank, Tringa totanusMarsh sandpiper, Tringa stagnatilisWood sandpiper, Tringa glareolaSpotted redshank, Tringa erythropusCommon greenshank, Tringa nebulariaCoursers and pratincoles
Order: CharadriiformesFamily: Glareolidae

Glareolidae is a family of wading birds comprising the pratincoles, which have short legs, long, pointed wings and long, forked tails, and the coursers, which have long legs, short wings and long, pointed bills which curve downwards.

Indian courser, Cursorius coromandelicusJerdon's courser, Rhinoptilus bitorquatusCollared pratincole, Glareola pratincolaOriental pratincole, Glareola maldivarumSmall pratincole, Glareola lacteaGulls, terns, and skimmers

Order: CharadriiformesFamily: Laridae

Laridae is a family of medium to large seabirds, the gulls, terns, and skimmers. Gulls are typically grey or white, often with black markings on the head or wings. They have stout, longish bills and webbed feet. Terns are a group of generally medium to large seabirds typically with grey or white plumage, often with black markings on the head. Most terns hunt fish by diving but some pick insects off the surface of fresh water. Terns are generally long-lived birds, with several species known to live in excess of 30 years.

Indian skimmer, Rynchops albicollisSlender-billed gull, Chroicocephalus geneiBrown-headed gull, Chroicocephalus brunnicephalusBlack-headed gull, Chroicocephalus ridibundusPallas's gull, Ichthyaetus ichthyaetusLesser black-backed gull, Larus fuscusGull-billed tern, Gelochelidon niloticaCaspian tern, Hydroprogne caspiaLittle tern, Sternula albifronsSooty tern, Onychoprion fuscatusRiver tern, Sterna aurantiaCommon tern, Sterna hirundoBlack-bellied tern, Sterna acuticaudaWhiskered tern, Chlidonias hybridaWhite-winged tern, Chlidonias leucopterusStorks

Order: CiconiiformesFamily: Ciconiidae

Storks are large, long-legged, long-necked, wading birds with long, stout bills. Storks are mute, but bill-clattering is an important mode of communication at the nest. Their nests can be large and may be reused for many years. Many species are migratory.

Painted stork, Mycteria leucocephalaAsian openbill, Anastomus oscitansBlack stork, Ciconia nigraWoolly-necked stork, Ciconia episcopusWhite stork, Ciconia ciconiaBlack-necked stork, Ephippiorhynchus asiaticusLesser adjutant, Leptoptilos javanicusAnhingas and darters

Order: SuliformesFamily: Anhingidae

Anhingas and darters are often called "snake-birds" because of their long thin neck, which gives a snake-like appearance when they swim with their bodies submerged. The males have black and dark-brown plumage, an erectile crest on the nape and a larger bill than the female. The females have much paler plumage especially on the neck and underparts. The darters have completely webbed feet and their legs are short and set far back on the body. Their plumage is somewhat permeable, like that of cormorants, and they spread their wings to dry after diving.

Oriental darter, Anhinga melanogasterCormorants and shags

Order: SuliformesFamily: Phalacrocoracidae

Phalacrocoracidae is a family of medium to large coastal, fish-eating seabirds that includes cormorants and shags. Plumage colouration varies, with the majority having mainly dark plumage, some species being black-and-white and a few being colourful.

Little cormorant, Microcarbo nigerIndian cormorant, Phalacrocorax fuscicollisGreat cormorant, Phalacrocorax carboIbises and spoonbills

Order: PelecaniformesFamily: Threskiornithidae

Threskiornithidae is a family of large terrestrial and wading birds which includes the ibises and spoonbills. They have long, broad wings with 11 primary and about 20 secondary feathers. They are strong fliers and despite their size and weight, very capable soarers.

Black-headed ibis, Threskiornis melanocephalusRed-naped ibis, Pseudibis papillosaGlossy ibis, Plegadis falcinellusEurasian spoonbill, Platalea leucorodiaHerons and bitterns

Order: PelecaniformesFamily: Ardeidae

The family Ardeidae contains the bitterns, herons and egrets. Herons and egrets are medium to large wading birds with long necks and legs. Bitterns tend to be shorter-necked and more wary. Members of Ardeidae fly with their necks retracted, unlike other long-necked birds such as storks, ibises and spoonbills.

Eurasian bittern, Botaurus stellarisLittle bittern, Ixobrychus minutusYellow bittern, Ixobrychus sinensisCinnamon bittern, Ixobrychus cinnamomeusBlack bittern, Ixobrychus flavicollisBlack-crowned night heron, Nycticorax nycticoraxStriated heron, Butorides striataIndian pond heron, Ardeola grayiiEastern cattle egret, Bubulcus coromandusGrey heron, Ardea cinereaPurple heron, Ardea purpureaGreat egret, Ardea albaIntermediate egret, Ardea intermediaLittle egret, Egretta garzettaWestern reef heron, Egretta gularisPelicans

Order: PelecaniformesFamily: Pelecanidae

Pelicans are large water birds with a distinctive pouch under their beak. As with other members of the order Pelecaniformes, they have webbed feet with four toes.

Spot-billed pelican, Pelecanus philippensisOsprey

Order: AccipitriformesFamily: Pandionidae

The family Pandionidae contains usually only one species, the osprey. The osprey is a medium-large raptor which is a specialist fish-eater.

Osprey, Pandion haliaetusKites, hawks, and eagles

Order: AccipitriformesFamily: Accipitridae

Accipitridae is a family of birds of prey, which includes hawks, eagles, kites, harriers and Old World vultures. These birds have powerful hooked beaks for tearing flesh from their prey, strong legs, powerful talons and keen eyesight.

Black-winged kite, Elanus caeruleusEgyptian vulture, Neophron percnopterusCrested honey buzzard, Pernis ptilorhynchusJerdon's baza, Aviceda jerdoniWhite-rumped vulture, Gyps bengalensisIndian vulture, Gyps indicusGriffon vulture, Gyps fulvusRed-headed vulture, Sarcogyps calvusCrested serpent eagle, Spilornis cheelaShort-toed snake eagle, Circaetus gallicusChangeable hawk-eagle, Nisaetus cirrhatusRufous-bellied eagle, Lophotriorchis kieneriiBlack eagle, Ictinaetus malayensisIndian spotted eagle, Clanga hastataGreater spotted eagle, Clanga clangaBooted eagle, Hieraaetus pennatusTawny eagle, Aquila rapaxSteppe eagle, Aquila nipalensisEastern imperial eagle, Aquila heliacaBonelli's eagle, Aquila fasciataCrested goshawk, Accipiter trivirgatusShikra, Accipiter badiusBesra, Accipiter virgatusEurasian sparrowhawk, Accipiter nisusNorthern goshawk, Accipiter gentilisWestern marsh harrier, Circus aeruginosusEastern marsh harrier, Circus spilonotus (A)
Hen harrier, Circus cyaneus 
Pallid harrier, Circus macrourusPied harrier, Circus melanoleucosMontagu's harrier, Circus pygargusBlack kite, Milvus migransBrahminy kite, Haliastur indusGrey-headed fish eagle, Haliaeetus ichthyaetusWhite-eyed buzzard, Butastur teesaLong-legged buzzard, Buteo rufinusCommon buzzard, Buteo buteoBarn owls
Order: StrigiformesFamily: Tytonidae

Barn owls are medium to large owls with large heads and characteristic heart-shaped faces. They have long strong legs with powerful talons.

Eastern barn owl, Tyto javanicaEastern grass owl, Tyto longimembrisOwls

Order: StrigiformesFamily: Strigidae

The typical owls are small to large solitary nocturnal birds of prey. They have large forward-facing eyes and ears, a hawk-like beak and a conspicuous circle of feathers around each eye called a facial disk.

Indian scops owl, Otus bakkamoenaOriental scops owl, Otus suniaIndian eagle-owl, Bubo bengalensisSpot-bellied eagle-owl, Bubo nipalensisDusky eagle-owl, Bubo coromandusBrown fish owl, Ketupa zeylonensisMottled wood owl, Strix ocellataBrown wood owl, Strix leptogrammicaJungle owlet, Glaucidium radiatumSpotted owlet, Athene bramaBrown boobook, Ninox scutulataShort-eared owl, Asio flammeusTrogons
Order: TrogoniformesFamily: Trogonidae

The family Trogonidae includes trogons and quetzals. Found in tropical woodlands worldwide, they feed on insects and fruit, and their broad bills and weak legs reflect their diet and arboreal habits. Although their flight is fast, they are reluctant to fly any distance. Trogons have soft, often colourful, feathers with distinctive male and female plumage.

Malabar trogon, Harpactes fasciatusHoopoes

Order: BucerotiformesFamily: Upupidae

Hoopoes have black, white and orangey-pink colouring with a large erectile crest on their head.

Eurasian hoopoe, Upupa epopsHornbills

Order: BucerotiformesFamily: Bucerotidae

Hornbills are a group of birds whose bill is shaped like a cow's horn, but without a twist, sometimes with a casque on the upper mandible. Frequently, the bill is brightly coloured.

Malabar pied hornbill, Anthracoceros coronatusIndian grey hornbill, Ocyceros birostrisRollers
Order: CoraciiformesFamily: Coraciidae

Rollers resemble crows in size and build, but are more closely related to the kingfishers and bee-eaters. They share the colourful appearance of those groups with blues and browns predominating. The two inner front toes are connected, but the outer toe is not.

Indian roller, Coracias benghalensisEuropean roller, Coracias garrulusKingfishers

Order: CoraciiformesFamily: Alcedinidae

Kingfishers are medium-sized birds with large heads, long, pointed bills, short legs and stubby tails.

Stork-billed kingfisher, Pelargopsis capensisWhite-throated kingfisher, Halcyon smyrnensisBlack-capped kingfisher, Halcyon pileataBlue-eared kingfisher, Alcedo menintingCommon kingfisher, Alcedo atthisPied kingfisher, Ceryle rudisBee-eaters

Order: CoraciiformesFamily: Meropidae

The bee-eaters are a group of near passerine birds in the family Meropidae. Most species are found in Africa but others occur in southern Europe, Madagascar, Australia and New Guinea. They are characterised by richly coloured plumage, slender bodies and usually elongated central tail feathers. All are colourful and have long downturned bills and pointed wings, which give them a swallow-like appearance when seen from afar.

Blue-bearded bee-eater, Nyctyornis athertoniAsian green bee-eater, Merops orientalisBlue-tailed bee-eater, Merops philippinusChestnut-headed bee-eater, Merops leschenaultiAsian barbets
Order: PiciformesFamily: Megalaimidae

The barbets are plump birds, with short necks and large heads. They get their name from the bristles which fringe their heavy bills. Most species are brightly coloured.

Brown-headed barbet, Psilopogon zeylanicusWhite-cheeked barbet, Psilopogon viridisCoppersmith barbet, Psilopogon haemacephalusWoodpeckers

Order: PiciformesFamily: Picidae

Woodpeckers are small to medium-sized birds with chisel-like beaks, short legs, stiff tails and long tongues used for capturing insects. Some species have feet with two toes pointing forward and two backward, while several species have only three toes. Many woodpeckers have the habit of tapping noisily on tree trunks with their beaks.

Eurasian wryneck, Jynx torquillaSpeckled piculet, Picumnus innominatusHeart-spotted woodpecker, Hemicircus canenteBrown-capped pygmy woodpecker, Yungipicus nanusYellow-crowned woodpecker, Leiopicus mahrattensisFulvous-breasted woodpecker, Dendrocopos maceiWhite-bellied woodpecker, Dryocopus javensisGreater yellownape, Picus flavinuchaLesser yellownape, Picus chlorolophusStreak-throated woodpecker, Picus xanthopygaeusCommon flameback, Dinopium javanenseBlack-rumped flameback, Dinopium benghalenseGreater flameback, Chrysocolaptes guttacristatusWhite-naped woodpecker, Chrysocolaptes festivusRufous woodpecker, Micropternus brachyurusCaracaras and falcons
Order: FalconiformesFamily: Falconidae

Falconidae is a family of diurnal birds of prey. They differ from hawks, eagles, and kites in that they kill with their beaks instead of their talons.

Lesser kestrel, Falco naumanniCommon kestrel, Falco tinnunculusRed-necked falcon, Falco chiqueraAmur falcon, Falco amurensisMerlin, Falco columbariusEurasian hobby, Falco subbuteoLaggar falcon, Falco juggerPeregrine falcon, Falco peregrinusOld World parrots

Order: PsittaciformesFamily: Psittaculidae

Characteristic features of parrots include a strong curved bill, an upright stance, strong legs, and clawed zygodactyl feet. Many parrots are vividly coloured, and some are multi-coloured. Old World parrots are found from Africa east across south and southeast Asia and Oceania to Australia and New Zealand.

Plum-headed parakeet, Psittacula cyanocephalaRed-breasted parakeet, Psittacula alexandriAlexandrine parakeet, Psittacula eupatriaRose-ringed parakeet, Psittacula krameriVernal hanging parrot, Loriculus vernalisPittas

Order: PasseriformesFamily: Pittidae

Pittas are medium-sized by passerine standards and are stocky, with fairly long, strong legs, short tails and stout bills. Many are brightly coloured. They spend the majority of their time on wet forest floors, eating snails, insects and similar invertebrates.

Indian pitta, Pitta brachyuraVangas, helmetshrikes, woodshrikes, and shrike-flycatchers
Order: PasseriformesFamily: Vangidae

The woodshrikes are similar in build to the shrikes.

Bar-winged flycatcher-shrike, Hemipus picatusLarge woodshrike, Tephrodornis gularisCommon woodshrike, Tephrodornis pondicerianusWoodswallows, butcherbirds, and peltops
Order: PasseriformesFamily: Artamidae

The woodswallows are soft-plumaged, somber-coloured passerine birds. They are smooth, agile flyers with moderately large, semi-triangular wings.

Ashy woodswallow, Artamus fuscusIoras
Order: PasseriformesFamily: Aegithinidae

The ioras are bulbul-like birds of open forest or thorn scrub, but whereas that group tends to be drab in colouration, ioras are sexually dimorphic, with the males being brightly plumaged in yellows and greens.

Common iora, Aegithina tiphiaCuckooshrikes

Order: PasseriformesFamily: Campephagidae

The cuckooshrikes are small to medium-sized passerine birds. They are predominantly greyish with white and black, although some species are brightly coloured.

White-bellied minivet, Pericrocotus erythropygiusSmall minivet, Pericrocotus cinnamomeusScarlet minivet, Pericrocotus speciosusAshy minivet, Pericrocotus divaricatusSwinhoe's minivet, Pericrocotus cantonensis (A)
Rosy minivet, Pericrocotus roseusLarge cuckooshrike, Coracina maceiBlack-winged cuckooshrike, Lalage melaschistosBlack-headed cuckooshrike, Lalage melanopteraShrikes
Order: PasseriformesFamily: Laniidae
Shrikes are passerine birds known for their habit of catching other birds and small animals and impaling the uneaten portions of their bodies on thorns. A typical shrike's beak is hooked, like a bird of prey.

Brown shrike, Lanius cristatus 
Isabelline shrike, Lanius isabellinus 
Bay-backed shrike, Lanius vittatusLong-tailed shrike, Lanius schachGrey-backed shrike, Lanius tephronotusGreat grey shrike, Lanius excubitorFigbirds, orioles, and turnagra
Order: PasseriformesFamily: Oriolidae

The Old World orioles are colourful passerine birds. They are not related to the New World orioles.

Black-hooded oriole, Oriolus xanthornusIndian golden oriole, Oriolus kundoo )
Black-naped oriole, Oriolus chinensisDrongos

Order: PasseriformesFamily: Dicruridae

The drongos are mostly black or dark grey in colour, sometimes with metallic tints. They have long forked tails, and some Asian species have elaborate tail decorations. They have short legs and sit very upright when perched, like a shrike. They flycatch or take prey from the ground.

Bronzed drongo, Dicrurus aeneusGreater racket-tailed drongo, Dicrurus paradiseusHair-crested drongo, Dicrurus hottentottusAshy drongo, Dicrurus leucophaeusWhite-bellied drongo, Dicrurus caerulescensBlack drongo, Dicrurus macrocercusFantails and silktails
Order: PasseriformesFamily: Rhipiduridae

The fantails are small insectivorous birds which are specialist aerial feeders.

White-throated fantail, Rhipidura albicollisWhite-spotted fantail, Rhipidura albogularisWhite-browed fantail, Rhipidura aureolaMonarchs

Order: PasseriformesFamily: Monarchidae

The monarch flycatchers are small to medium-sized insectivorous passerines which hunt by flycatching.

Black-naped monarch, Hypothymis azureaIndian paradise flycatcher, Terpsiphone paradisiCrows and jays
Order: PasseriformesFamily: Corvidae

The family Corvidae includes crows, ravens, jays, choughs, magpies, treepies, nutcrackers and ground jays. Corvids are above average in size among the Passeriformes, and some of the larger species show high levels of intelligence.

Rufous treepie, Dendrocitta vagabundaGrey treepie, Dendrocitta formosaeHouse crow, Corvus splendensIndian jungle crow, Corvus culminatusTits and chickadees

Order: PasseriformesFamily: Paridae

The Paridae are mainly small stocky woodland species with short stout bills. Some have crests. They are adaptable birds, with a mixed diet including seeds and insects.

Cinereous tit, Parus cinereusHimalayan black-lored tit, Machlolophus xanthogenysIndian black-lored tit, Machlolophus aplonotusLarks

Order: PasseriformesFamily: Alaudidae

Larks are small terrestrial birds with often extravagant songs and display flights. Most larks are fairly dull in appearance. Their food is insects and seeds.

Rufous-tailed lark, Ammomanes phoenicuraAshy-crowned sparrow-lark, Eremopterix griseusSinging bush lark, Mirafra cantillansIndian bush lark, Mirafra erythropteraJerdon's bush lark, Mirafra affinisOriental skylark, Alauda gulgulaSykes's lark, Galerida devaCrested lark, Galerida cristataMongolian short-toed lark, Calandrella dukhunensisGreater short-toed lark, Calandrella brachydactylaBulbuls

Order: PasseriformesFamily: Pycnonotidae

Bulbuls are medium-sized songbirds. Some are colourful with yellow, red or orange vents, cheeks, throats or supercilia, but most are drab, with uniform olive-brown to black plumage. Some species have distinct crests.

Yellow-browed bulbul, Acritillas indicaBlack-crested bulbul, Rubigula flaviventrisWhite-browed bulbul, Pycnonotus luteolusYellow-throated bulbul, Pycnonotus xantholaemusRed-whiskered bulbul, Pycnonotus jocosusRed-vented bulbul, Pycnonotus caferSwallows and martins

Order: PasseriformesFamily: Hirundinidae

The family Hirundinidae is adapted to aerial feeding. They have a slender streamlined body, long pointed wings and a short bill with a wide gape. The feet are adapted to perching rather than walking, and the front toes are partially joined at the base.

Grey-throated martin, Riparia chinensisSand martin, Riparia ripariaBarn swallow, Hirundo rusticaWire-tailed swallow, Hirundo smithiiEurasian crag martin, Ptyonoprogne concolorDusky crag martin, Ptyonoprogne concolorCommon house martin, Delichon urbicumAsian house martin, Delichon dasypusRed-rumped swallow, Cecropis dauricaStreak-throated swallow, Petrochelidon fluvicolaLeaf warblers and allies
Order: PasseriformesFamily: Phylloscopidae

Leaf warblers are a family of small insectivorous birds found mostly in Eurasia and ranging into Wallacea and Africa. The species are of various sizes, often green-plumaged above and yellow below, or more subdued with grayish-green to grayish-brown colors.

Hume's leaf warbler, Phylloscopus humeiYellow-browed warbler, Phylloscopus inornatusTytler's leaf warbler, Phylloscopus tytleriSulphur-bellied warbler, Phylloscopus griseolusTickell's leaf warbler, Phylloscopus affinisPlain leaf warbler, Phylloscopus neglectusCommon chiffchaff, Phylloscopus collybitaGreen-crowned warbler, Phylloscopus burkiiGreen warbler, Phylloscopus nitidusGreenish warbler, Phylloscopus trochiloidesLarge-billed leaf warbler, Phylloscopus magnirostrisWestern crowned warbler, Phylloscopus occipitalisBlyth's leaf warbler, Phylloscopus reguloidesReed warblers, Grauer's warbler, and allies

Order: PasseriformesFamily: Acrocephalidae

The members of this family are usually rather large for "warblers". Most are rather plain olivaceous brown above with much yellow to beige below. They are usually found in open woodland, reedbeds, or tall grass. The family occurs mostly in southern to western Eurasia and surroundings, but it also ranges far into the Pacific, with some species in Africa.

Clamorous reed warbler, Acrocephalus stentoreusPaddyfield warbler, Acrocephalus agricolaBlyth's reed warbler, Acrocephalus dumetorumThick-billed warbler, Arundinax aedonBooted warbler, Iduna caligataSykes's warbler, Iduna ramaGrassbirds and allies
Order: PasseriformesFamily: Locustellidae

Locustellidae are a family of small insectivorous songbirds found mainly in Eurasia, Africa, and the Australian region. They are smallish birds with tails that are usually long and pointed, and tend to be drab brownish or buffy all over.

Long-billed bush warbler, Locustella majorCommon grasshopper warbler, Locustella naeviaBristled grassbird, Schoenicola striatusCisticolas and allies

Order: PasseriformesFamily: Cisticolidae

The Cisticolidae are warblers found mainly in warmer southern regions of the Old World. They are generally very small birds of drab brown or grey appearance found in open country such as grassland or scrub.

Zitting cisticola, Cisticola juncidisRufous-fronted prinia, Prinia buchananiRufescent prinia, Prinia rufescensGrey-breasted prinia, Prinia hodgsoniiJungle prinia, Prinia sylvaticaAshy prinia, Prinia socialisPlain prinia, Prinia inornataCommon tailorbird, Orthotomus sutoriusSylviid babblers
Order: PasseriformesFamily: Sylviidae

The family Sylviidae is a group of small insectivorous passerine birds. They mainly occur as breeding species, as the common name implies, in Europe, Asia and, to a lesser extent, Africa. Most are of generally undistinguished appearance, but many have distinctive songs.

Lesser whitethroat, Curruca currucaHume's whitethroat, Curruca althaeaEastern Orphean warbler, Curruca crassirostrisParrotbills and allies

Order: PasseriformesFamily: Paradoxornithidae

The parrotbills are a group of peculiar birds native to East and Southeast Asia, though feral populations exist elsewhere. They are generally small, long-tailed birds which inhabit reedbeds and similar habitat. They feed mainly on seeds, e.g. of grasses, to which their bill, as the name implies, is well-adapted.

Yellow-eyed babbler, Chrysomma sinenseWhite-eyes

Order: PasseriformesFamily: Zosteropidae

The white-eyes are small and mostly undistinguished, their plumage above being generally some dull colour like greenish-olive, but some species have a white or bright yellow throat, breast or lower parts, and several have buff flanks. As their name suggests, many species have a white ring around each eye.

Indian white-eye, Zosterops palpebrosusBabblers and scimitar babblers
Order: PasseriformesFamily: Timaliidae

The babblers, or timaliids, are somewhat diverse in size and colouration, but are characterised by soft fluffy plumage.

Tawny-bellied babbler, Dumetia hyperythraPin-striped tit-babbler, Mixornis gularisBuff-chested babbler, Cyanoderma ambiguumIndian scimitar babbler, Pomatorhinus horsfieldiiGround babblers
Order: PasseriformesFamily: Pellorneidae

These small to medium-sized songbirds have soft fluffy plumage but are otherwise rather diverse. Members of the genus Illadopsis are found in forests, but some other genera are birds of scrublands.

Puff-throated babbler, Pellorneum ruficepsAlcippe fulvettas

Order: PasseriformesFamily: Alcippeidae

The genus once included many other fulvettas and was previously placed in families Pellorneidae or Timaliidae.

Brown-cheeked fulvetta, Alcippe poioicephalaLaughingthrushes and allies

Order: PasseriformesFamily: Leiothrichidae

The members of this family are diverse in size and colouration, though those of genus Turdoides tend to be brown or greyish. The family is found in Africa, India, and southeast Asia.

Large grey babbler, Argya malcolmiJungle babbler, Argya striataYellow-billed babbler, Argya affinisCommon babbler,  Argya caudataNuthatches
Order: PasseriformesFamily: Sittidae

Nuthatches are small woodland birds. They have the unusual ability to climb down trees head first, unlike other birds which can only go upwards. Nuthatches have big heads, short tails and powerful bills and feet.

Velvet-fronted nuthatch, Sitta frontalisIndian nuthatch, Sitta castaneaTreecreepers
Order: PasseriformesFamily: Certhiidae

Treecreepers are small woodland birds, brown above and white below. They have thin pointed down-curved bills, which they use to extricate insects from bark. They have stiff tail feathers, like woodpeckers, which they use to support themselves on vertical trees.

Indian spotted creeper, Salpornis spilonotaStarlings and rhabdornis

Order: PasseriformesFamily: Sturnidae

Starlings are small to medium-sized passerine birds. Their flight is strong and direct and they are very gregarious. Their preferred habitat is fairly open country. They eat insects and fruit. Plumage is typically dark with a metallic sheen.

Common hill myna, Gracula religiosaJungle myna, Acridotheres fuscusBank myna, Acridotheres ginginianusCommon myna, Acridotheres tristisPied myna, Gracupica contraChestnut-tailed starling, Sturnia malabaricaBrahminy starling, Sturnia pagodarumRosy starling, Pastor roseusCommon starling, Sturnus vulgarisThrushes and allies
Order: PasseriformesFamily: Turdidae

The thrushes are a group of passerine birds that occur mainly in the Old World. They are plump, soft plumaged, small to medium-sized insectivores or sometimes omnivores, often feeding on the ground. Many have attractive songs.

Orange-headed thrush, Geokichla citrinaTickell's thrush, Turdus unicolorIndian blackbird, Turdus simillimusOld World flycatchers

Order: PasseriformesFamily: Muscicapidae

Old World flycatchers are a large group of small passerine birds native to the Old World. They are mainly small arboreal insectivores. The appearance of these birds is highly varied, but they mostly have weak songs and harsh calls.

Indian robin, Copsychus fulicatusOriental magpie-robin, Copsychus saularisWhite-rumped shama, Copsychus malabaricusAsian brown flycatcher, Muscicapa dauuricaBrown-breasted flycatcher, Muscicapa muttuiHill blue flycatcher, Cyornis whiteiTickell's blue flycatcher, Cyornis tickelliaeBlue-throated blue flycatcher, Cyornis rubeculoidesVerditer flycatcher, Eumyias thalassinusIndian blue robin, Larvivora brunneaBluethroat, Luscinia svecicaSiberian rubythroat, Calliope calliopeMalabar whistling thrush, Myophonus horsfieldiiUltramarine flycatcher, Ficedula superciliarisLittle pied flycatcher, Ficedula westermanniRusty-tailed flycatcher, Ficedula ruficaudaTaiga flycatcher, Ficedula albicillaRed-breasted flycatcher, Ficedula parvaKashmir flycatcher, Ficedula subrubraBlack redstart, Phoenicurus ochrurosBlue rock thrush, Monticola solitariusBlue-capped rock thrush, Monticola cinclorhynchaSiberian stonechat, Saxicola maurus 
Pied bush chat, Saxicola caprataGrey bush chat, Saxicola ferreusIsabelline wheatear, Oenanthe isabellinaDesert wheatear, Oenanthe desertiBrown rock chat, Oenanthe fuscaLeafbirds

Order: PasseriformesFamily: Chloropseidae

The leafbirds are small, bulbul-like birds. The males are brightly plumaged, usually in greens and yellows.

Jerdon's leafbird, Chloropsis jerdoniGolden-fronted leafbird, Chloropsis aurifronsFlowerpeckers
Order: PasseriformesFamily: Dicaeidae

The flowerpeckers are very small, stout, often brightly coloured birds, with short tails, short thick curved bills and tubular tongues.

Thick-billed flowerpecker, Dicaeum agilePale-billed flowerpecker, Dicaeum erythrorhynchosSunbirds

Order: PasseriformesFamily: Nectariniidae

The sunbirds and spiderhunters are very small passerine birds which feed largely on nectar, although they will also take insects, especially when feeding young. Flight is fast and direct on their short wings. Most species can take nectar by hovering like a hummingbird, but usually perch to feed.

Purple-rumped sunbird, Leptocoma zeylonicaPurple sunbird, Cinnyris asiaticusLoten's sunbird, Cinnyris loteniusCrimson sunbird, Aethopyga siparajaLittle spiderhunter, Arachnothera longirostraOld World sparrows and snowfinches
Order: PasseriformesFamily: Passeridae

Sparrows are small passerine birds. In general, sparrows tend to be small, plump, brown or grey birds with short tails and short powerful beaks. Sparrows are seed eaters, but they also consume small insects.

House sparrow, Passer domesticusYellow-throated sparrow, Gymnoris xanthocollisWeavers and widowbirds

Order: PasseriformesFamily: Ploceidae

The weavers are small passerine birds related to the finches. They are seed-eating birds with rounded conical bills. The males of many species are brightly coloured, usually in red or yellow and black, some species show variation in colour only in the breeding season.

Black-breasted weaver, Ploceus benghalensisStreaked weaver, Ploceus manyarBaya weaver, Ploceus philippinusWaxbills, munias, and allies

Order: PasseriformesFamily: Estrildidae

The estrildid finches are small passerine birds of the Old World tropics and Australasia. They are gregarious and often colonial seed eaters with short thick but pointed bills. They are all similar in structure and habits, but have wide variation in plumage colours and patterns.

Indian silverbill, Euodice malabaricaScaly-breasted munia, Lonchura punctulataBlack-throated munia, Lonchura kelaartiWhite-rumped munia, Lonchura striataTricolored munia, Lonchura malaccaGreen avadavat, Green avadavatRed avadavat, Amandava amandavaWagtails and pipits

Order: PasseriformesFamily: Motacillidae

Motacillidae is a family of small passerine birds with medium to long tails. They include the wagtails, longclaws and pipits. They are slender, ground feeding insectivores of open country.

Forest wagtail, Dendronanthus indicusWestern yellow wagtail, Motacilla flavaEastern yellow wagtail, Motacilla tschutschensis (A)
Citrine wagtail, Motacilla citreolaGrey wagtail, Motacilla cinereaWhite wagtail, Motacilla albaWhite-browed wagtail, Motacilla maderaspatensisRichard's pipit, Anthus richardiPaddyfield pipit, Anthus rufulusBlyth's pipit, Anthus godlewskiiTawny pipit, Anthus campestrisLong-billed pipit, Anthus similisTree pipit, Anthus trivialisOlive-backed pipit, Anthus hodgsoniRed-throated pipit, Anthus cervinusFinches and euphonias

Order: PasseriformesFamily: Fringillidae

Finches are seed-eating passerine birds, that are small to moderately large and have a strong beak, usually conical and in some species very large. All have twelve tail feathers and nine primaries. These birds have a bouncing flight with alternating bouts of flapping and gliding on closed wings, and most sing well.

Common rosefinch, Carpodacus erythrinusBuntings
Order: PasseriformesFamily: Emberizidae

The emberizids are a large family of passerine birds. They are seed-eating birds with distinctively shaped bills. In Europe, most species are called buntings. In North America, most of the species in this family are known as sparrows, but these birds are not closely related to the Old World sparrows which are in the family Passeridae. Many emberizid species have distinctive head patterns.

Crested bunting, Emberiza lathamiGrey-necked bunting, Emberiza buchananiBlack-headed bunting, Emberiza melanocephalaRed-headed bunting, Emberiza bruniceps''

See also
 Lists of birds by region

References

Telangana
Telangana-related lists